The Acura ZDX is a mid-size luxury crossover SUV with a sloping rear roofline developed by Honda for its upmarket brand Acura. The car was originally planned to be called the "MSX". The ZDX debuted at the 2009 New York International Auto Show on April 8, 2009, as a 2010 model.  The vehicle was also the first to be completely designed at Acura's southern California design studio in Torrance.

The original ZDX concept was penned by Michelle Christensen who labeled it a "4-door luxury sports coupe" and which Acura says "blurs the distinction between coupe, sedan and sport utility vehicle."

The ZDX features Acura's first six speed automatic transmission, advanced ventilated seats, as well as other luxury appointments. Although the ZDX shares a similar profile with the Honda Crosstour, the two vehicles are not mechanically related: the latter is based on the Honda Accord, while the ZDX is based on the Honda Pilot/Acura MDX.

On August 19, 2022, it was announced that the ZDX nameplate would return to Acura's lineup in 2024 for the brand's first electric vehicle. The new ZDX will be co-developed with General Motors.

Concept version

Five teaser shots, released by Acura between March 16 and 20, 2009, indicated a coupe-like sloping roofline akin to that of the BMW X6, which led many observers to believe that is its direct competitor. After the announcement about naming the vehicle ZDX, Acura added the words "Luxury Four-Door Sports Coupe" to the caption for each picture. Moreover, it did not state the vehicle as a crossover or an SUV.  The automaker translated the designers renderings almost literally into production sheetmetal. It's all but unheard-of for a rookie designer to have sketches embraced by a car company and put into production with so few changes.

Production version
Sales began in winter 2009.

The Technology Package adds the Navigation System with voice recognition, an Acura/ELS Surround premium audio system and a new multi-view rear camera. Advance Package adds blind spot monitoring system, Collision Mitigating Braking System (CMBS), Adaptive Cruise Control (ACC) and Integrated Dynamics System (IDS), which brought multiple modes of suspension firmness and response using electronically controlled Magneto-Rheological shock absorbers.

For 2013, in a last ditch attempt, Acura sold the ZDX in only one trim level.  Acura cut costs by eliminating CMBS, ACC and IDS and replaced them with Forward Collision Warning (FCW), Lane Departure Warning (LDW), redesigned front grille, integrated parking sensors, power-folding auto-dimming side mirrors, and new dark accents for the wheels.  This resulted in a MSRP ($51,815) over $5K less than the previous year advance model.

The 2013 ZDX has one well-equipped trim level. Standard features include a navigation system with an 8-inch screen, satellite radio, USB input, Bluetooth, dual-zone automatic climate control, leather upholstery, ventilated and heated seats (front), cruise control, keyless entry, power-folding side mirrors, an auto-dimming rearview mirror, power tailgate, moonroof, and auto on/off headlights. Standard safety features include forward collision warning, lane departure warning, blind spot monitoring, parking sensors, and a rearview camera. The ZDX has 27.5 cubic feet of cargo space behind its 60/40 split-folding rear seats and just 57.3 cubic feet with them folded flat, which is very small by class standards.

Discontinuation

The ZDX was discontinued after the 2013 model year due to poor sales, and in a statement from Honda, "as the Acura brand sharpens its focus on new models and core products." The ZDX was the rarest of U.S. manufactured Acura offerings, with a total of 7,191 vehicles produced and sold in North America.

Revival 

On August 19th, 2022 Acura announced that a new fully electric (EV) ZDX would enter production for the 2024 model year. This will also be Acura's first fully electric vehicle. The new 2nd generation ZDX is being co-developed using General Motors' Ultium battery technology that currently power the Cadillac Lyriq, GMC Hummer EV, and Honda's new model the Prologue also planned for a 2024 release. This model is also planned to have a Type S performance variant. Like the Prologue and Lyriq this vehicle is suspected be built on GM's BEV3 platform. This vehicle should have similar dimensions to the 1st generation ZDX which is comparable to the current gen Honda Passport.

Safety

Sales

References

External links

Acura - official site

ZDX
Cars introduced in 2009
2010s cars
Mid-size sport utility vehicles
Luxury crossover sport utility vehicles
All-wheel-drive vehicles